Mu'omu'a is a district of Haʻapai division, Tonga.

References 

Haʻapai